Richmond Mamah Laryea (born January 7, 1995) is a Canadian professional soccer player who plays as a right-back or midfielder for Major League Soccer club Toronto FC, on loan from Premier League club Nottingham Forest, and the Canada national team.

College career
Prior to his college career, Laryea played for Sigma FC Academy and Dante Alighieri Academy in Toronto. Laryea played college soccer at the University of Akron for two seasons, reaching the College Cup semi-finals in 2015. Laryea was named to the All-Mid-American Conference Second Team in 2014, and was named to the All-Mid-American Conference First Team in 2015. He played for League1 Ontario club Sigma FC in 2015, where he was named a League All-Star. Following his sophomore season, Laryea signed a contract with Generation Adidas.

Club career

Orlando City 
Laryea was drafted in the first round (7th overall) of the 2016 MLS SuperDraft by Orlando City. He was loaned to Orlando City B in March 2016.

After spending the first half of his second season once again on loan to OCB playing as both an attacking and defensive midfielder, Laryea made his MLS debut on June 25, 2017, subbing on for Kaká in a 4–0 defeat to Chicago Fire. Laryea got his first MLS assist on September 27, 2017, assisting on Yoshimar Yotún's goal against New England Revolution. He made his first career MLS start on the final day of the season away to Philadelphia Union.

On November 27, 2018, the club announced they had declined his contract option.

Toronto FC
On March 21, 2019, Laryea signed for MLS side Toronto FC. Laryea scored his first goal for Toronto on May 26, 2019, in a 2–1 home defeat to the San Jose Earthquakes, was also his first MLS goal. Laryea scored his first playoff goal, against DC United, and then defeated Atlanta United to win the Eastern Conference (MLS) playoffs. Laryea and Toronto FC then lost to Seattle Sounders FC in the 2019 MLS Cup final. Laryea would have his option for the 2020 season exercised by Toronto, keeping him with the club for 2020. On September 27, 2020, Laryea scored a solo goal and provided two assists in the second half of Toronto's 3–1 win against the league-leading Columbus Crew. Laryea was named the MLS Player of the Week as a result of his performance.

Nottingham Forest
On January 8, 2022, EFL Championship club Nottingham Forest signed Laryea on a transfer from Toronto FC, signing a three-and-a-half year contract. After featuring only sparingly in Forest's matchday squads during his first few months, Laryea made his debut on April 18 against West Bromwich Albion, as a second-half substitute for Djed Spence in an eventual 4-0 victory.

In August 2022, he returned on loan to Toronto FC until the end of June 2023. To complete the transaction, Toronto sent $225,000 in General Allocation Money to FC Dallas and $125,000 in General Allocation Money to FC Cincinnati to acquire the top spot in the MLS Allocation Order.

International career
In May 2016, Laryea was called to Canada's U23 national team for a pair of friendlies against Guyana and Grenada. Laryea scored in the opening match against Guyana.

Laryea received his first call up to the senior team on August 26, 2019, for two CONCACAF Nations League matches against Cuba. He made his debut in the first match on September 7, 2019. On March 25, 2021, Laryea scored his first goal for Canada in a 5–1 win over Bermuda in the team's first 2022 World Cup qualifying match.

In June 2021, Laryea was named to Canada's 60-man preliminary squad for the 2021 CONCACAF Gold Cup. On July 1, he was named to the final 23-man squad.

In November 2022, Laryea was called up to the squad for the 2022 FIFA World Cup.

Personal life
Laryea is of Ghanaian descent. His younger brother, Reggie Laryea, plays soccer for semi-professional team Vaughan Azzurri.

Career statistics

Club

International

International goals 
As of March 25, 2021. Scores and results list Canada's goal tally first, score column indicates score after each Laryea goal.

Honours 
Toronto FC
 Eastern Conference Championship (Playoffs): 2019
Nottingham Forest

 EFL Championship play-offs: 2022

References

External links

Living people
1995 births
Canadian people of Ghanaian descent
Canadian soccer players
Soccer players from Toronto
Association football midfielders
Association football fullbacks
Canada men's international soccer players
2021 CONCACAF Gold Cup players
2022 FIFA World Cup players
Sigma FC players
Akron Zips men's soccer players
Orlando City SC players
Orlando City B players
Toronto FC players
Nottingham Forest F.C. players
Orlando City SC draft picks
League1 Ontario players
USL Championship players
Major League Soccer players
Canadian expatriate soccer players
Canadian expatriate sportspeople in the United States
Expatriate soccer players in the United States
Expatriate footballers in England
Canadian expatriate sportspeople in England